Far-right politics in Australia describes authoritarian ideologies, including fascism and White supremacy as they manifest in Australia. 

In Australia the far-right first came to public attention with the formation in 1931 of the New Guard in Sydney and its offshoot, the Centre Party in 1933. These proto-fascist groups were monarchist, anti-communist and authoritarian in outlook. These early far-right groups were followed by the explicitly fascist Australia First Movement (1941). Far-right groups and individuals in Australia went on to adopt more explicitly racial positions during the 1960s and 1970s, morphing into self-proclaimed Nazi, fascist and anti-Semitic movements, organisations that opposed non-white and non-Christian immigration, such as the neo-Nazi National Socialist Party of Australia (1967) and the militant white supremacist group National Action (Australia) (1982).

Since the 1980s, the term has mainly been used to describe those who advocate for preservation of what they perceive to be Christian Anglo-Australian culture, and those who campaign against Aboriginal land rights, multiculturalism, immigration and asylum seekers. Since 2001, Australia has seen the formation of several neo-Nazi, neo-Fascist or alt-right groups such as the True Blue Crew, the United Patriots Front, Fraser Anning's Conservative National Party and the Antipodean Resistance, and others.

Australian nationalism was a 19th-century movement, mostly concerned with establishing an Australian national identity, but more recently, some far-right groups have also dubbed themselves Australian nationalists.

20th century

An early exponent of fascist ideology in Australia was the writer and poet William Baylebridge, who was later associated with P. R. Stephensen and the Australia First Movement in the 1930s and early 1940s.

1930s to 1960s

The New Guard (1930s)

The Australian far right rose out of the monarchist and anti-communist movements. Formed in Sydney on 16 February 1931, the New Guard was the first and largest fascist organisation in Australia. It was formed by World War I veteran, Australian monarchist and anti-communist, Eric Campbell. The group comprised mostly returned servicemen and claimed a membership of 50,000 at its peak, including prominent members of society such as aviator Sir Charles Kingsford Smith and former Mayor of North Sydney Hubert Primrose.

The New Guard was a paramilitary organisation with its members being well armed and receiving military training. The New Guard under Campbell orchestrated a number of operations, including strike breaking, attacking Labor Party members and "Communist" meetings; they also demanded the deportation of Communists. During the initial growth of the movement, Campbell was able to attract many ex-soldiers and ex-commanders to the movement.

The New Guard saw the Premier of New South Wales Jack Lang as an immediate threat. The organisation attracted attention when member Francis de Groot, on horseback and at Campbell's direction, upstaged Lang in cutting the ribbon at the opening ceremony of the Sydney Harbour Bridge in protest at Lang's anti-monarchist sentiments.

After Lang's dismissal in May 1932 the New Guard's membership declined rapidly.

White Army

The White Army (so named after the Russian White Army),  also known as the League of National Security (LNS), was formed in Victoria around 1931, headed by the Chief Commissioner of Victoria Police, Thomas Blamey and  described as a fascist paramilitary group. The group, which existed for about eight years from 1931, comprised several senior army officers, including Col. Francis Derham, a Melbourne lawyer, and Lt. Col. Edmund Herring, later Chief Justice of Victoria. Some members had been members of the New Guard, and both groups were involved in street fights with leftist groups. This was reportedly a response to the rise of communism in Australia. Its members stood ready to take up arms to stop a Catholic or communist revolution.

The Centre Party (1933-1935)

The Centre Party was a fascist political party formed in December 1933, following Lang's dismissal and the demise of the New Guard. Eric Campbell established the party after he had met with European fascists and National Socialists such as Sir Oswald Mosley and Joachim von Ribbentrop. Campbell repositioned the remnants of the New Guard away from paramilitary activities and into electoral politics.

The Centre Party contested the May 1935 New South Wales state election, polling 0.60% of the total vote. Following the party's poor showing at the election Campbell withdrew from public life and the party disbanded.

Australia First Movement

The Australia First Movement was a short-lived Australian fascist movement founded in October 1941. The group was anti-Semitic and national socialist, advocating the corporate state and a political alliance with the Axis powers of Germany, Italy and Japan.

The group was disbanded in March 1942, when a number of its members were secretly interned by the Australian government on suspicion that they might attempt to provide help to Japanese invaders. Two members were convicted of treason. Australia First Movement member and former member of the Centre Party Adela Pankhurst, of the famous suffragette family, was arrested and interned in 1942 for her advocacy of peace with Japan.

Australian League of Rights

The Australian League of Rights is a fascist and anti-Semitic political organisation. It was founded in Adelaide, South Australia by Eric Butler in 1946, and organised nationally in 1960. The party's ideology was based on the economic theory of Social Credit expounded by C. H. Douglas. The League describes itself as upholding the values of "loyalty to God, Queen and Country".

The group inspired groups like the British League of Rights, Canadian League of Rights and the New Zealand League of Rights. In 1972 Butler created an umbrella group, the Crown Commonwealth League of Rights, to represent the four groups; it also served as a chapter of the World League for Freedom and Democracy.

1960s to 2000s

Australian National Socialist Party (1962-1968)

The Australian National Socialist Party (ANSP) was a minor Australian neo-Nazi party. The party was founded in 1962 by University of Adelaide physics student Ted Cawthron and Sydney council worker Don Lindsay. The group was anti-communist, and supported the White Australia policy and the total annexation of New Guinea.

On 26 June 1964, the party's headquarters were raided by police. Smith and four other party members were arrested and convicted of possessing unlicensed firearms and explosives and possession of stolen goods. By 1967 the remnants of the party had joined the newly formed National Socialist Party of Australia.

National Socialist Party of Australia (1967-1970s) 

The National Socialist Party of Australia (NSPA) was a minor Australian neo-Nazi party formed in 1967 by former ANSP leader Ted Cawthron. In May 1968, the ANSP merged into the NSPA, and Cawthron and Frank Molnar attempted to distance themselves and the party from the "jackbooted 'Nazi' image" associated with the ANSP.

In early 1970, Cawthron contested the May 1970 ACT by-election, making him the first National Socialist in Australia to run for public office. The party also made a number of unsuccessful runs for the Senate.

Jim Saleam was made deputy leader of the party between 1972 and 1975. Saleam became a prominent figure in far-right politics, going on to found National Action in 1982 and the Australia First Party 1996.

National Action (1982-1991)

National Action was a militant white supremacist group founded on Anzac Day 1982 by the former deputy leader of the National Socialist Party of Australia, Jim Saleam and former neo-Nazi David Greason.

In 1989, Saleam was convicted of being an accessory before the fact in regard to organising the attempted assassination of African National Congress representative Eddie Funde. Saleam claimed to have been set up by police.

In 1991, the group was disbanded following the murder of a member, Wayne "Bovver" Smith, in the group's headquarters in the Sydney suburb of Tempe. Following the murder of Smith, Saleam became NSW chairman of Australia First Party.

Australian National Alliance (1978-1981)

Progressive Conservative Party (Australia) (1980)

Australian Nationalist Movement (1985-2007)

The Australian Nationalist Movement (ANM), also known as the Australian Nationalist Worker's Union (ANWU), was a Western Australian neo-Nazi, extreme right-wing group founded and led by Peter Joseph "Jack" van Tongeren.

In 1987, Van Tongeren distributed 400,000 racist posters around Perth. The posters bore phrases such as "No Asians", "White Revolution The Only Solution", "Coloured Immigration: Trickle Is Now A Flood" and "Asians Out Or Racial War". Van Tongeren is a holocaust denier.

In 1989, Van Tongeren staged a series of racially motivated arson attacks, targeting businesses owned by Asian Australians. Van Tongeren served thirteen years in prison for his crimes. In the late 1980s it was revealed that his father was Javanese, making him of Indonesian ancestry. He resumed anti-Asian activities upon his release in 2002 leading to further convictions in 2006.

In 1989, two ANM members murdered police informant David Locke. The murder trial of the two men eventually led to Van Tongeren being found guilty of 53 crimes and sentenced to 18 years. The two men who murdered David Locke received life sentences.

On being released from jail in 2002, Van Tongeren expressed no remorse. In February 2004 three Chinese restaurants, synagogues and Asian-owned businesses were firebombed, plastered with posters and daubed with swastikas. Western Australian police launched "Operation Atlantic" in response to the attacks, leading to the arrest of five men involved in the attacks. The police also identified a plot to harm WA Attorney-General Jim McGinty and his family, among others.

In August 2004, Van Tongeren and his co-accused Matthew Billing were found and arrested in the Boddington area south-east of Perth. Both men once again faced the courts over the 2004 arson plots. During a hearing on 2 November, Van Tongeren collapsed, was taken to hospital, and later used a wheelchair. Van Tongeren was released from jail on the condition that he leave Western Australia. In 2007 the ANM/ANWU was reported to have been disbanded.
Van Tongeren has been a member of a number of far-right extremist groups including National Action (Australia) and the Australia First Movement.

Australian Citizens Party

Founded in 1988, The Australian Citizens Party (formerly known as “Citizens Electoral Council of Australia” or CEC) is a minor political party in Australia affiliated with the international LaRouche Movement which was led by American political activist Lyndon LaRouche. The group has been accused, by B'nai B'rith, of being anti-Semitic, anti-gay, anti-Aboriginal and racist. The document cites CEC publications and quotes former CEC members.

The group has been accused of "brainwashing" members and engaging in campaigns involving "dirty tricks".

Australians Against Further Immigration (1989-2008)

Australians Against Further Immigration (AAFI) was an Australian far-right anti-immigration political party which described itself as "eco-nationalist" and was against positive net immigration. The party was founded in 1989 and dissolved in 2008. The party was deregistered by the Australian Electoral Commission in December 2005, because it was lacking the minimum 500 members required to be registered as a political party.

Confederate Action Party of Australia (1992-1993)

Reclaim Australia: Reduce Immigration (1996-1999)

21st-century groups

Antipodean Resistance

Antipodean Resistance (AR) is an Australian neo-Nazi group. Formed in October 2016, the group's flag features a swastika. The group's logo features the black sun and Totenkopf (skull head) with an Akubra hat, a laurel wreath and a swastika. Antipodean Resistance promotes and incites hatred and violence, as illustrated in its anti-Jewish and anti-homosexual posters, with graphic images of shooting Jews and homosexuals in the head. One poster called to "Legalise the execution of Jews."

In 2017, it was reported that ASIO, the Australian national security organisation, was monitoring the group, who were "willing to use violence to further their own interests".

Members of the Antipodean Resistance and Lads Society organised the creation of a new group, the National Socialist Network, in 2020.

Australian Defence League

The Australian Defence League (ADL) is a neo-Nazi street gang. The gang is anti-Islam, and has been involved in making terrorist threats, abusing, stalking and doxxing Muslim Australians. The gang was founded in Sydney in 2009 by recidivist criminal Ralph Cerminara. Cerminara has a significant criminal record, including convictions for assault, high-range drink-driving and breaching apprehended violence orders.

Australian Protectionist Party

The Australian Protectionist Party (also known as the Party For Freedom) is a minor far-right anti-immigration party, focused on economic protectionism and white nationalism. The Australian Protectionist Party has been active in protesting against the presence of asylum seekers and Muslims, and has also organised several protests against Sharia law being implemented in Australia. The party has unsuccessfully contested a number of elections, failing to secure more than 1% of the vote in any election it has contested.

Australia First Party

The Australia First Party (AFP) is a militant white supremacist political party founded in 1996 by Graeme Campbell and currently led by Jim Saleam. The party stands on a nationalist, anti-multicultural and economic protectionist platform. The Party's current platform includes the reintroduction of the White Australia policy and opposition to Chinese immigration.

Campbell was Australia First's leader until June 2001, when he left the party to stand as a One Nation Senate candidate in Western Australia. After serving time in jail for organising the failed attempted assassination of Eddie Funde, Saleam took control of the party and ran as an its candidate for a seat on Marrickville council, New South Wales, claiming "to oppose Marrickville being a Refugee Welcome Zone". Later that year the party formed its youth wing, the Patriotic Youth League. The party contested the 2010 federal election, the 2013 federal election, the 2016 federal election, the 2017 Cootamundra state by-election, the 2018 Longman by-election, and the 2019 New South Wales state election, but failed to poll at more than 2% on any occasion. Saleam's platform included the reintroduction of the White Australia policy and opposition to Chinese immigration.

On 20 March 2019, Australia First member Nathan Sykes was charged with at least eight offences relating to threats he made to a number of journalists.

Australian Liberty Alliance (2015-2020)
The Australian Liberty Alliance (ALA), created in 2015, was rebranded as Yellow Vest Australia in 2019. It was a minor political party in Australia, with Debbie Robinson as party president. The party was the political wing of the Q Society. Founded in 2015, the party was anti-Islamic, with policies focusing on Muslim immigration such as enforcing "integration over separation", replacing multiculturalism with an integrated multi-ethnic society and stopping public funding for "associations formed around foreign nationalities". They vowed to "stop the Islamisation of Australia". The party was deregistered in 2020.

Creativity Movement/Alliance

The Creativity Movement, self-described as a "church" but in reality an anti-Christian, white supremacist, neo-Nazi organisation, was founded in the United States in 1997 as an offshoot of the 1973 Church of the Creator, and had adherents in Australia until 2010. The group ceased to exist elsewhere in the world by 2020, and the police seized the Creativity Movement website in 2021. The domain name creativitymovement.org is now held by the Creativity Alliance. Founded in 2003 after the arrest of the American Creativity Movement leader, Matt Hale, the Creativity Alliance is an Adelaide-based offshoot of the Church of the Creator, run by Cailen Cambeul.

The Creativity Alliance includes numerous Church of Creativity groups, such as the "Church of Creativity – Victoria", with its now-defunct website stating that it is "A Creativity Alliance website", was operational from at least 2004 until 2017 and has since been blended into the main Creativity Alliance website along with all other regional Church of Creativity websites. The Victorian website stated that it "objects to... Christianity, multiculturalism and Marxism". A 2010 version of the website listed its five core beliefs, including "our Race is our Religion;... the White Race is Nature’s Finest; ... Racial Loyalty is the greatest of all honors, and racial treason is the worst of all crimes; ...what is good for the White Race is the highest virtue, and what is bad for the White Race is the ultimate sin; ...[and] that the one and only, true and revolutionary White Racial Religion -Creativity- is the only salvation for the White Race".

A Liberal Party campaigner who had been a leading member of the Young Liberals in Geelong, Scott Harrison, was revealed to have been a member of this organisation for six years prior to 2010, but had turned his back on those beliefs. He resigned from the Liberal Party after anti-Semitic articles written by him emerged, including airing a theory that the Port Arthur massacre was master-minded by Jews, as well as a photo of him gesturing with a Nazi salute in front of a swastika.

Some activity by members were reported in Melbourne and the Surf Coast in 2015. In 2011, after stickers advocating “White Power” were found in Victoria, the group was investigated by the state's Multicultural Affairs Minister. The group says it is committed to achieving its aims by non-violent means.

The Dingoes

In 2016 the Dingoes were described in a 2016 news report as "young, educated and alternative right", comparing the group to the Identitarian movement in Europe. The group self-described themselves as “politically incorrect larrikins”, and one member praised Donald Trump for embodying "white values". Members do not reveal their identity.

The Dingoes were mentioned as one of the groups involved in the 2018 infiltration to the NSW Young Nationals (see below). National Party MP George Christensen and One Nation candidate Mark Latham were both was interviewed on the Dingoes podcast, called The Convict Report, but Christensen later said that he would not have done it if he had known about their extremist views. The podcast also featured a New Zealand man who ran the Dominion Movement, who was later arrested for sharing information that threatened NZ security. The group planned a 2018 conference in Sydney, dubbed DingoCon, at which US far-right figure Mike Enoch was invited to speak.

The group posts anti-Semitic and other racist commentary on Twitter, and have used the same meme character as the perpetrator of the 2019 Christchurch mosque shootings. The podcast was shut down after the attack.

Fraser Anning's Conservative National Party (2019-2020)

Fraser Anning's Conservative National Party was a populist, far-right, white nationalist party founded by Fraser Anning in April 2019, when he was a senator for Queensland. Anning had previously been a senator for Pauline Hanson's One Nation and Katter's Australian Party, and sat as an independent before founding the new party. The party contested the 2019 federal election, but failed to win a seat. The party was deregistered on 23 September 2020.

Lads Society

The Lads Society is a far-right white nationalist extremist group founded by several former members of the United Patriots Front in late 2017, with club houses in Sydney and Melbourne. The Lads Society came to national prominence after it staged a rally in St Kilda, Victoria, targeting the local African Australian community. Attendees were seen making the Nazi salute and one was photographed brandishing an SS helmet. In 2017, the group's leader Thomas Sewell approached the perpetrator of the Christchurch mosque shootings, Brenton Harrison Tarrant, asking him to join the Lads Society, but Tarrant refused. The group's members and allies attempted to infiltrate the Young Nationals in NSW, and engaged in branch stacking at the May 2018 conference. Lads Society members attained leadership positions in the Young Nationals, but were later forced out of the party. Canadian alt-right activist Lauren Southern and white nationalist Stefan Molyneux met with Lads Society members during their visit to Australia.

Undated videos leaked to the press in November 2019 revealed Lads Society leader Sewell's aim to attract and recruit members from mainstream society under the guise of a men's fitness club. His white supremacist agenda was clearly shown as he outlined plans which included the creation of “Anglo-European” enclaves in Australian cities, encouraging the “speed and ferocity of the decay” of society to help foment a "race war" by such tactics as exploiting the "African gangs" trope used by Home Affairs Minister Peter Dutton and other mainstream politicians.

Members of the Lads Society and Antipodean Resistance organised the creation of a new group, the National Socialist Network, in late 2020, and Sewell was one of the organisers of a 2021 group trip to the Grampians in January 2021 (see below).

Love Australia or Leave

Love Australia or Leave is a far-right, nationalist political party based in Queensland. It has been registered for federal elections since October 2016, after being founded by Kim Vuga, who is still the head. The party platform includes opposition to mass immigration and Islam in Australia, and support of Australia leaving the United Nations. The party ran candidates at the 2019 Australian federal election in Queensland, New South Wales and Tasmania, but failed to win any seats.

National Socialist Network

The National Socialist Network (NSN) was formed by members of the Lads Society and Antipodean Resistance in late 2020. It is a Melbourne-based neo-Nazi group that claims to be active in Adelaide, Melbourne, Sydney, Brisbane, Canberra, Perth and several regional cities, but which would not reveal how many members or associates the group has. It has vowed to bring about a “white revolution” and has openly described Indigenous Australians as “subhuman and monkeys”. They also engage in anti-Semitic and other racist behaviour. Its leader is Thomas Sewell, an ex-Australian army soldier turned neo-Nazi, who is also leader of the Lads Society.

The group helped to organise a group of about 38 young white men who paraded Nazi symbolism and shouted offensive slogans in the Grampians region over the Australia Day weekend in January 2021 (see below).

In March 2021, Victoria Police's counter-terrorism command charged Sewell with affray, recklessly causing injury, and unlawful assault after he allegedly punched a security guard working for the Nine Network in Melbourne's Docklands. The alleged assault took place prior to the broadcast of an A Current Affair report about Sewell's organisation.

New Guard (2015–2018)

The New Guard (not to be confused with the 1930s New Guard mentioned above) was a group with a presence on Facebook between 2015 and 2018. Self-described as fascists, the group's aim was to influence mainstream politics. Their tactics included spreading propaganda about protecting Australia's European identity as well as opening businesses and buying property to create wealth, using this to try to influence the election of state and federal parliamentarians. Part of the group's plans was to create a kind of "pioneer Europa", where people subscribing to such views would live, governed by a sympathetic mayor. The men-only group was revealed to have infiltrated the Young Nationals in New South Wales in late 2018, leading to its demise.

Patriotic Youth League/Eureka Youth League

The Patriotic Youth League (PLY) was a neo-Nazi micro group and the youth wing of the Australia First Party, founded in 2002 by former One Nation activist Stuart McBeth. The Patriotic Youth League was mainly active in the northern suburbs of Sydney and Melbourne, and played a large role in the 2005 Cronulla riots. It disbanded in 2006, but was reincarnated as the Eureka Youth League in 2010.

Q Society of Australia (2010-2020)

The Q Society of Australia was a far-right, homophobic and Islamophobic organisation that opposed Muslim immigration and the presence of Muslims in Australian society. Founded in 2010, Q Society referred to itself as "Australia's leading Islam-critical organisation" and stated that its purpose was to fight against the "Islamisation of Australia". The group's events featured extreme homophobia and Islamophobia. Its president was Debbie Robinson, who was also president of the Australian Liberty Alliance (later Yellow Vest Australia).
On 13 February 2020, the Q Society stated that it would deregister itself due to lack of financial support, effective from 30 June 2020.

Reclaim Australia (2015-2017?)

Formed in 2015, Reclaim Australia is a loosely associated far-right Australian nationalist protest group which draws support from nationalists, white supremacists, neo-Nazis and other far-right groups, which is primarily focused on opposing Islam. The group held street rallies between 2015 and 2017, and often faced counter-protests from trade unions, human rights and anti-racism activists. After observing many Reclaim Australia rallies and interviewing participants, author John Safran described it as a loose collective of different groups such as the United Patriots Front and Danny Nalliah's Catch the Fire Ministries.

The Australian Security Intelligence Organisation (ASIO), says that it monitors the group because of its potential for violence.

Rise Up Australia Party (2011-2019)

The Rise Up Australia Party was a far-right, Christian political party launched in June 2011. The party's policy platform was focused on nationalist and fundamentalist Christian values. It was opposed to Islam in Australia and opposes same-sex marriage. Its slogan was "Keep Australia Australian". The party was founded and was led by Pentecostal minister Danny Nalliah, who is also the president of Catch the Fire Ministries. The party opposed multiculturalism, wanted to preserve Australia's "Judeo-Christian heritage", called for cuts to Muslim immigration, and advocated freedom of speech and freedom of religion.
After the 2019 Australian federal election, on 26 June 2019, the party was voluntarily deregistered by the Australian Electoral Commission.

Soldiers of Odin Australia

Soldiers of Odin (SOO) is an anti-immigrant group founded in Kemi, Finland, in October 2015, in the midst of the European migrant crisis. The 
Soldiers of Odin Australia arose out of the Reclaim Australia group, and was registered as a non-profit association with the Victorian government in June 2016.  That same year the group ran racially-driven vigilante "safety patrols" around Federation Square, Birrarung Marr and Bourke Street Mall and outside city train stations at night to counteract what it claims was the inability of police to protect the public from rising street crime and gangs such as the so-called Apex gang. They also distributed food to homeless people in the city.

Their recruitment rhetoric included exaggerating illegal entry to the country, crime perpetrated by immigrants and the threat of Islamic terrorism, targeting mainly Anglo-Australian men; they also used the "exotic Norse mythology" to attract far-right sympathisers who were willing to take public action.

While they attracted significant press coverage in the second half of 2016,
 their presence seemed to have faded fairly quickly, and by 2020 they were no longer deemed a significant far-right group.

True Blue Crew

The True Blue Crew (TBC) is an Australian militant white supremacist group. Members and supporters have been linked to right-wing terrorism and vigilantism, and members have been arrested with weapons and on terrorism-related charges. Experts who have studied the group say it appears to be "committed to violence". The True Blue Crew was formed in 2015 as a splinter group from the anti-Islamic Reclaim Australia group, along with a number of small far-right nationalist groups such as the United Patriots Front.

In December 2019 a member of True Blue Crew, Phillip Galea, was convicted of terrorism charges relating to planned bombings of the Victorian Trades Hall and other left wing organisations in Melbourne.

United Patriots Front (2015-2017)

The United Patriots Front (UPF) was a far-right extremist group whose membership was composed of neo-Nazis and fundamentalist Christians. Based in the state of Victoria, UPF was a nationalist anti-Islam organisation that stood in opposition to immigration, opposition to multiculturalism and Islam by demonstrations. It was a splinter group from Reclaim Australia group, formed after a dispute between Shermon Burgess and Reclaim Australia organisers. The group has been described by a number of media outlets and journalists as a hate group, and has claimed solidarity with Golden Dawn. The group was disbanded in 2017. The UPF's leaders went on to form a new, more explicitly White nationalist group, the Lads Society, later that same year.

Others

Another extremist group mentioned in connection with infiltration to the NSW Young Nationals in 2018 (see below) is Squadron 88.

There was a small group called Identity Australia that was formed around March 2019, which described itself as "a youth-focused identitiarian organisation dedicated to giving European Australians a voice and restoring Australia's European character", and published a manifesto detailing its beliefs, but its website is  non-operational.

Other potentially violent groups active in Australia include the Southern Cross Hammerskins and the Crazy Whiteboys. The latter is a violent anti-Asian, anti-Semitic and anti-African Australian group (also described as skinhead) founded in 2009 in Melbourne. Two of their members were given jail sentences after a particularly vicious and brutal attack on an Asian student in 2012.

Other far-right groups whose profiles have varied include the Nationalist Australian Alternative, Australian Traditionalism, and the New National Action.

There is some cross-over between the two groups which call themselves Freemen on the Land (FOTL) and Sovereign Citizens (and some others), but both have their roots in the American farm crisis and the US/Canadian financial crisis of the 1980s, and their core beliefs may be broadly defined as "see[ing] the state as a corporation with no authority over free citizens". In 2011, Malcolm Roberts wrote a letter to then Prime Minister Julia Gillard filled with characteristic sovereign citizen ideas, but denied that he was a "sovereign citizen". There have been several court cases testing this concept, none successful for the "freemen". In 2015, the New South Wales Police Force identified "sovereign citizens" as a potential terrorist threat, estimating that there were about 300 sovereign citizens in the state at the time. There have been a few minor cases where parties have invoked arguments surrounding the "sovereign man", but the arguments have failed. Sovereign Citizens from the US have undertaken speaking tours to New Zealand and Australia, with some support among farmers struggling with drought and other hardships. A group called United Rights Australia (U R Australia) has a Facebook presence, and there are other websites promulgating Freemen/Sovereign Citizen ideas. From the 2010s, there has been a growing number of Freemen targeting Indigenous Australians, with groups with names like Tribal Sovereign Parliament of Gondwana Land, the Original Sovereign Tribal Federation (OSTF) and the Original Sovereign Confederation. Some proponents have conflated sovereign state beliefs with the land rights movement.

Incidents

Bendigo mosque protests (2014–5)

In 2014 the City of Bendigo announced the construction of a m mosque and Islamic community centre in Bendigo, Victoria. Some residents created a "Stop the Mosque in Bendigo" group, and certain far-right organisations, in particular the Q Society, mobilised residents and brought in outsiders to oppose the construction by conducting extensive protests. In October 2015, around 1,000 people turned up for a protest organised by the United Patriots Front. Members of the extremist group Right Wing Resistance Australia travelled from interstate, and the Rise Up Australia Party was also represented.

Infiltration of the Young Nationals (2018)

In 2018, it was revealed that the NSW Young Nationals had been infiltrated by a significant  number of neo-Nazis and other far-right extremists. Party leader Michael McCormack denounced these attempts, and the leader of the NSW Nationals, John Barilaro, also denounced racism and fascism within the party. The suspected neo-Nazis were expelled from the party and its youth wing. Several of the men who infiltrated the organisation were from the New Guard (see above). The 19 members expelled from the party also included members of the Lads Society, Antipodean Resistance, Squadron 88, and the Dingoes.

Christchurch mosque shootings (2019)

Australian far-right terrorist Brenton Harrison Tarrant committed the March 2019 mosque shootings at Al Noor Mosque and Linwood Islamic Centre in Christchurch, New Zealand, killing 51 people and injuring 50 more. Tarrant had expressed support for two Australian far-right organizations, the United Patriots Front and the True Blue Crew online, and repeatedly praised Blair Cottrell, a neo-Nazi and former leader of the UPF, affectionately calling him "Emperor Blair Cottrell" during a celebration of Donald Trump being elected as President of the United States in 2016; he also donated money to the UPF.

Grampians neo-Nazi trip (2021)
On the Australia Day weekend in January 2021, the National Socialist Network, a new group created by members of the Antipodean Resistance and the Lads Society under Lads leader Thomas Sewell, were observed parading Nazi paraphernalia and harassing bystanders at several locations around the Grampians in Victoria. One Halls Gap resident said: “There were 40 white males, many with skinheads, some chanting ‘white power’”. They were reported to have chanted "sieg heil" and "white power", burnt a cross, and posted stickers saying "Australia For The White Man".

Concerned citizens reported them to police, who confronted the group and later collected video evidence from security videos. Victoria Police’s Counter Terrorism Command and ASIO were notified, and the incident was widely covered in the media. One anti-Semitism expert called for the group to be branded a terrorist group, saying "We know that there is a direct link between incitement, between vilification … and shooting rampages that we saw not just in Christchurch, but in other places".

Australian far-right figures
Fraser Anning, former Queensland Senator (2017-2019) and One Nation member, founder of Fraser Anning's Conservative National Party
William Baylebridge, writer and poet, later associated with Stephensen's Australia First Movement
Eric Butler, founder of the Australian League of Rights
Cailen Cambeul, co-founder of the Creativity Alliance related to the Creativity Movement
Eric Campbell (political activist) Chief Commander of the New Guard, Leader of the Centre Party
Graeme Campbell, MP (1980-1998) former Labor and One Nation member, founder of Australia First Party
Ralph Cerminara, founder of Australian Defence League
Blair Cottrell, founding member of United Patriots Front, Lads Society
Neil Erikson, founding member of United Patriots Front, Lads Society
Phillip Galea, former member of the True Blue Crew, convicted of planning a terrorist attack in 2019
Pauline Hanson, founder of One Nation, Senator for Queensland (2016-present).
George Hodges Knox, former Nationalist Party, United Australia Party and Liberal Party member, Deputy Chief Commander of the New Guard
Danny Nalliah, founder and leader of Rise Up Australia
Adela Pankhurst, former communist and suffragette turned fascist, co-founder of the fascist Australia First Movement
Debbie Robinson, founder and leader of Yellow Vest Australia and director of Q Society
Jim Saleam, founder of National Action, former National Socialist Party of Australia and One Nation member, leader of Australia First Party
Thomas Sewell, leader of the National Socialist Network
P. R. Stephensen, co-founder of the fascist Australia First Movement
Brenton Harrison Tarrant, white nationalist neo-fascist far-right terrorist responsible for the Christchurch mosque shootings in Christchurch, New Zealand
Jack van Tongeren, founder of the Australian Nationalist Movement 
Avi Yemini, former Israeli soldier, associated with the United Patriots Front and Lads Society 
Bernard Gaynor, anti-gay activist and Iraq war veteran.

See also

References

Further reading

 

 

 

 
Antisemitism in Australia
Fascist movements
Political history of Australia
Political movements in Australia
Neo-Nazism in Australia
Anti-Islam sentiment in Australia
White nationalism in Australia